HMS H21 was a British H class submarine built by Vickers Limited, Barrow-in-Furness, as the first of the Batch 3 H class submarines. She was launched on 20 October 1917 and was commissioned on 28 January 1918. H21 was an improved design of the H class which produced a larger displacement and the latest 21 inch torpedo tubes replacing the old 18 inch torpedo tubes. This would be incorporated into all batch 3 H class submarines. HMS H21 was sold to John Cashmore Ltd on 13 July 1926 for scrapping at Newport.

Design

H21 was fitted with an anti-aircraft gun and four  torpedo tubes. Its torpedo tubes were fitted to the bows and the submarine was loaded with eight  torpedoes. It is a Holland 602 type submarine but was designed to meet Royal Navy specifications. Its complement was twenty-two crew members.

References

Bibliography
 

 

British H-class submarines
Ships built in Barrow-in-Furness
1917 ships
World War I submarines of the United Kingdom
Royal Navy ship names